Pasiphila fumipalpata is a moth in the family Geometridae. It is endemic to New Zealand.

Description
Both genders are white, red, green, and grey.

References

External links

Moths described in 1875
fumipalpata
Moths of New Zealand